Volos Football Club is a Greek professional football club based in Volos, Magnesia, Greece. The club currently competes in the Super League, the first tier of football in Greece. Volos plays its home matches at the Panthessaliko Stadium.

History
After years of unsuccessful efforts and negotiations between the two older football clubs of Volos (Niki and Olympiakos) to be merged to create a strong football club for the city, finally in April 2017 discussions and efforts by Achilleas Beos, mayor of Volos, led to the creation of a new football club. It was decided Pydna Kitros to be dissolved and renamed and thus, Volos New Football Club was created, the official presentation of which was held on June 2.

The team, which took the position of Pydna Kitros in Gamma Ethniki for the 2017–18 season, began its preparation with significant transcriptional movements. Volos eventually won first place in Group 4 and 2nd in Group 1 of the Promotion Play-Offs, and they were promoted to the Football League.

Stadium
Volos' stadium is located in the Neapoli area in Volos, in particular at the end of Neapoli. Neapoli Municipal Stadium is constructed several years at this point, but in the summer of 2017 the Municipality of Volos refurbished it on behalf of Volos NFC who will later use it as a seat. It has a capacity of 2,500 tiers, while there is a shelter on the northwest side.

Sponsorship
Shirt Sponsor: Interwetten
Sport Clothing Manufacturer: Luanvi
Golden Sponsor: INTERKAT

Season to season

Players

Current squad

Management team
{|class="wikitable"
|-
!Position
!Staff
|-
|Manager|| Kostas Bratsos
|-
|Assistant coach|| Pantelis Bousias
|-
|Fitness coach|| Panagiotis Konomaras
|-
|Goalkeeper coach|| Antonis Panagiotopoulos
|-
|Medical director|| Parisenia Paxinou
|-
|Physiotherapist|| Stefanos Zisis
|-

Honours

Domestic
Leagues:
Football League (Second Division)   
 Winners (1): 2018–19
Gamma Ethniki (Third Division)
 Winners (1): 2017–18

References

External links
Official website 
Media

 
Football clubs in Thessaly
Magnesia
Sport in Volos
Association football clubs established in 2017
2017 establishments in Greece